A nuclear clock or nuclear optical clock is a notional clock that would use the frequency of a nuclear transition as its reference frequency, in the same manner as an atomic clock uses the frequency of an electronic transition in an atom's shell. Such a clock is expected to be more accurate than the best current atomic clocks by a factor of about 10, with an achievable accuracy approaching the 10−19 level.
The only nuclear state suitable for the development of a nuclear clock using existing technology is thorium-229m, a nuclear isomer of thorium-229 and the lowest-energy nuclear isomer known. With an energy of about 8 eV,
the corresponding ground-state transition is expected to be in the vacuum ultraviolet wavelength region around 150 nm, which would make it accessible to laser excitation. A comprehensive review can be found in reference.

Principle of operation 

Modern optical atomic clocks are by today the most accurate time-keeping devices. Their underlying principle of operation is based on the fact that the energy of an atomic transition (the energy difference between two atomic states) is independent of space and time. The atomic transition energy corresponds to a particular frequency of a light wave, which is required to drive the transition. Therefore, an atomic transition can be excited with the help of laser light, if the laser frequency is exactly matching the frequency corresponding to the energy of the atomic transition. Thus, in turn, the laser frequency can be stabilized to match the corresponding atomic transition energy by continuous verification of a successful laser excitation of the atomic transition. In case of successful stabilization to an atomic transition, the frequency of the laser light will always be the same (independent of space and time).

It is technologically possible to measure the frequency of laser light to extraordinary high accuracy by counting the oscillations of the light wave with the help of a frequency comb. This allows time to be measured simply by counting the number of oscillations of the laser light, that has been stabilized to a particular atomic transition. Such a device is known as optical atomic clock. One prominent example for an optical atomic clock is the ytterbium (Yb) lattice clock, where a particular transition in the ytterbium-171 isotope is used for laser stabilization. In this case, one second has elapsed after exactly  oscillations of the laser light stabilized to the corresponding transition. Other examples for optical atomic clocks of the highest accuracy are the ytterbium(Yb)-171 single-ion clock, the strontium(Sr)-87 optical lattice clock and the aluminum(Al)-27 single-ion clock. The achieved accuracies of these clocks vary around 10−18, corresponding to about 1 second of inaccuracy in 30 billion years, significantly longer than the age of the universe.

For a nuclear optical clock the principle of operation remains unchanged, however, with the important difference that a nuclear transition instead of an atomic shell transition is used for laser stabilization. The expected advantage of a nuclear clock compared to an atomic clock is that, figuratively speaking, the atomic nucleus is smaller than the atomic shell by up to five orders of magnitude and therefore (due to small magnetic dipole and electric quadrupole moments) significantly less affected by external influences like, e.g., electric and magnetic fields. Such external perturbations are the limiting factor for the achieved accuracies of atomic-shell based clocks. Due to this conceptual advantage, a nuclear optical clock is expected to achieve a time accuracy approaching 10−19, a ten-fold improvement over atomic-shell based clocks.

Different nuclear clock concepts 
Two different concepts for nuclear optical clocks have been discussed in the literature: trap-based nuclear clocks and solid-state nuclear clocks.

Trap-based nuclear clocks 
For a trap-based nuclear clock either a single 229Th ion is trapped in a Paul trap, known as the single-ion nuclear clock, or a chain of multiple ions is trapped, considered as the multiple-ion nuclear clock. Such clocks are expected to achieve the highest time accuracy, as the ions are to a large extent isolated from its environment. A multiple-ion nuclear clock could have a significant advantage over the single-ion nuclear clock in terms of stability performance.

Solid-state nuclear clocks 
As the nucleus is largely unaffected by the atomic shell, it is also intriguing to embed many nuclei into a crystal lattice environment. This concept is known as the crystal-lattice nuclear clock. Due to the high density of embedded nuclei of up to 1018 per cm3, this concept would allow to irradiate a huge amount of nuclei in parallel, thereby drastically increasing the achievable signal-to-noise ratio, however, on the cost of potentially higher external perturbations. It was also proposed to irradiate a metallic 229Th surface and to probe the isomer’s excitation in the internal conversion channel, which is known as the internal-conversion nuclear clock. Both types of solid-state nuclear clocks were shown to offer the potential for comparable performance.

Transition requirements 

From the principle of operation of a nuclear optical clock it is evident, that direct laser excitation of a nuclear state is a central requirement for the development of a nuclear clock. Until today no direct nuclear laser excitation has been achieved. The central reason is that the typical energy range of nuclear transitions (keV to MeV) is orders of magnitude above the maximum energy which is accessible with significant intensity by today's narrow-bandwidth laser technology (a few eV). There are only two nuclear excited states known, which possess an extraordinary low excitation energy (below 100 eV). These are 229mTh, a metastable nuclear excited state of the isotope thorium-229 with an excitation energy of only about 8 eV and 235mU, a metastable excited state of Uranium-235 with an energy of 76.7 eV. For nuclear structure reasons, only 229mTh offers a realistic chance for direct nuclear laser excitation.

Further requirements for the development of a nuclear clock are, that the lifetime of the nuclear excited state is relatively long, thereby leading to a resonance of narrow bandwidth (a high quality factor) and that the ground-state nucleus is easily available and sufficiently long-lived to allow to work with moderate quantities of the material. Fortunately, with a radiative lifetime of 103 to 104 seconds of 229mTh and a lifetime of about 7917 years of a 229Th nucleus in its ground state, both conditions are fulfilled for 229mTh, making it an ideal candidate for the development of a nuclear clock.

History

The history of the nuclear clock 

A nuclear optical clock based on 229mTh was first proposed in 2003 by E. Peik and C. Tamm, who developed an idea of U. Sterr. The paper contains both concepts, the single-ion nuclear clock, as well as the solid-state nuclear clock.

In their pioneering work, Peik and Tamm proposed to use individual laser-cooled 229Th3+ ions in a Paul trap to perform nuclear laser spectroscopy. Here the 3+ charge state is advantageous, as it possesses a shell structure suitable for direct laser cooling. It was further proposed to excite an electronic shell state, to achieve 'good' quantum numbers of the total system of the shell plus nucleus that will lead to a reduction of the influence induced by external perturbing fields. A central idea is to probe the successful laser excitation of the nuclear state via the hyperfine-structure shift induced into the electronic shell due to the different nuclear spins of ground- and excited state. This method is known as the double-resonance method.

The expected performance of a single-ion nuclear clock was further investigated in 2012 by C. Campbell et al. with the result that a systematic frequency uncertainty (accuracy) of the clock of 1.5·10−19 could be achieved, which would be by about an order of magnitude better than the accuracy achieved by the best optical atomic clocks today. The nuclear clock approach proposed by Campbell et al. slightly differs from the original one proposed by Peik and Tamm. Instead of exciting an electronic shell state in order to obtain the highest insensitivity against external perturbing fields, the nuclear clock proposed by Campbell et al. uses a stretched pair of nuclear hyperfine states in the electronic ground-state configuration, which appears to be advantageous in terms of the achievable quality factor and an improved suppression of the quadratic Zeeman shift.

The solid-state nuclear clock approach was further developed in 2010 by W.G. Rellergert et al. with the result of an expected long-term accuracy of about 2·10−16. Although expected to be less accurate than the single-ion nuclear clock approach due to line-broadening effects and temperature shifts in the crystal lattice environment, this approach may have advantages in terms of compactness, robustness and power consumption. The expected stability performance was investigated by G. Kazakov et al. in 2012. In 2020, the development of an internal conversion nuclear clock was proposed.

Important steps on the road towards a nuclear clock were a precision gamma-ray spectroscopy experiment which allowed to determine the isomeric energy to 7.8±0.5 eV, the successful direct laser cooling of 229Th3+ ions in a Paul trap achieved in 2011, the direct detection of the 229mTh decay in 2016 and a first detection of the isomer-induced hyperfine-structure shift, enabling the double-resonance method to probe a successful nuclear excitation in 2018. In 2019, the isomer’s energy was measured via the detection of internal conversion electrons emitted in its direct ground-state decay to 8.28±0.17 eV. Also a first successful excitation of the 29 keV nuclear excited state of 229Th  via synchrotron radiation was reported. In 2020, an energy of 8.10±0.17 eV was obtained from precision gamma-ray spectroscopy.

The history of 229mTh 

Since 1976, the 229Th nucleus has been known to possess a low energy excited state, which was constrained to be of below 10 eV excitation energy in 1990 and for which an energy value of 3.5±1.0 eV was determined in 1994.  As early as 1996 it was proposed to use the nuclear excitation as a highly stable source of light for metrology by E.V. Tkalya.

At the time of the nuclear clock proposal in 2003 the parameters of 229mTh, in particular its energy, were not known to sufficient precision to allow for nuclear laser spectroscopy of individual thorium ions and thus the development of a nuclear clock. This fact triggered a multitude of experimental efforts to pin down the excited state's parameters like energy and half-life. The detection of light emitted in the direct decay of 229mTh would significantly help to determine its energy to higher precision, however until today all efforts failed to observe a secure signal of light emitted in the decay of 229mTh. The failure of early experiments to observe any direct 229mTh decay signal can partly be explained by a correction of the energy value to 7.6±0.5 eV in 2007 (slightly shifted to 7.8±05 eV in 2009). However, also all recent experiments failed to observe any signal of light emitted in the direct decay, potentially pointing towards a strong non-radiative decay channel. In 2012 and again in 2018 the detection of light emitted in the decay of 229mTh was reported, but the observed signals are subject to controversial discussions within the community.

A direct detection of electrons as being emitted in the isomer's internal conversion decay channel was achieved in 2016. This detection laid the foundation for the determination of the 229mTh half-life in neutral, surface-bound atoms in 2017 and a first laser-spectroscopic characterization in 2018. In 2019 an improved energy value based on internal-conversion-electron spectroscopy could be determined. Also, a secure excitation of the isomer via population of the 29 keV state with synchrotron radiation was achieved. More recently, two additional papers about the isomeric energy were published.

Applications 

When operational, a nuclear optical clock is expected to be applicable in various fields. Potential applications may arise in the field where already today's atomic clocks are in operation, like e.g., satellite-based navigation or data transfer. However, also potentially new applications may arise in the fields of relativistic geodesy, the search for topological dark matter, or the determination of time-variations of fundamental constants.

Especially a high sensitivity of a nuclear clock for potential time variations of fundamental constants, e.g., the fine-structure constant, has been highlighted. The central idea is that a nuclear transition couples differently to the fine-structure constant than an atomic shell transition does. For this reason a comparison of the frequency of a nuclear clock with an atomic clock could lead to an extraordinary high sensitivity for potential time variations of the fine structure constant. The achievable factor of sensitivity, however, remains subject to speculation. A recent measurement is consistent with enhancement factors between 1 (no enhancement) and 104.

References

External links
 thorium nuclear clock – project of the EU

Nuclear physics
Atomic clocks